Sunningdale School is a family-run boys' preparatory independent boarding school of around 100 pupils, situated in Sunningdale in Berkshire, close to London, England.

Introduction
Sunningdale School is a small school that seeks to educate its pupils in a range of subjects and disciplines, and to encourage them to take the Common Entrance Examination for entry to senior independent boarding schools. In previous decades, many former pupils have gone on to some of Britain's best independent schools, including Eton College, Harrow School, Oundle School, Shrewsbury School, Radley College, Winchester College, Sherborne School, Marlborough College, Wellington College and Charterhouse.

He was later joined by his son, Theophilus Girdlestone, who helped run the school for the next quarter of a century until an unfortunate period for the family with Girdlestone dying on 22 February 1897 and Theophilus quickly following on 25 June 1899. This would lead to the school being sold in 1900 to the next headmaster, F. L. Crabtree (1900–33), the pupils numbered 27. Since its foundation, the school has had only seven heads.

The school was the subject of a BBC television documentary, Britain's Youngest Boarders, first broadcast in September 2010.

Background
The school has its own chapel, and a house in Normandy, France to which each boy goes for a week three times during his time at Sunningdale. The school's major sports are football, rugby union and cricket in the Michaelmas, Lent and summer terms respectively. Boys also play tennis, squash, Eton Fives, basketball, field hockey, golf and table tennis against other independent boarding schools. Fives has been played at Sunningdale since at least 1892 and the school has 3 courts on site. They also compete in athletics, cross-country, fencing, judo and air rifle shooting. There is a heated indoor swimming pool which means that the boys can swim all year round. The sports hall includes two full-length cricket nets and an air rifle range. There is also a 7-hole golf course in the grounds. Boys can also ride and do clay pigeon shooting and in their last term they do an outward bound course on Dartmoor. Indoor activities include chess, model railway, cooking, bridge, snooker, Scottish dancing, drama, model making and board games.

Former pupils
Former pupils of Sunningdale School include:  
 Henry Blofeld, BBC cricket commentator
 Michael Bowes-Lyon, 18th Earl of Strathmore and Kinghorne
 Sir Henry Cecil, horse racing trainer
 Guy Clark, Lord Lieutenant of Renfrewshire
 John Crichton, Viscount Crichton, property consultant
 Henry Field, US anthropologist who documented Iraq's Marsh Arabs
 Francis Fulford, Devon landowner, reality star of The F***ing Fulfords
 Bamber Gascoigne, British television presenter and author
 Gerald Grosvenor, 6th Duke of Westminster, the former richest aristocrat in the UK
 Carey Harrison, novelist and dramatist
 Frederick Hervey, 8th Marquess of Bristol
 Bernard Heywood, Church of England bishop 
 Nick Hurd, Government Minister
 Prince Michael of Kent, cousin of the Queen and member of the Royal Family
 Lord Frederick Windsor, British Royal and financial analyst
 William Kinghan, unionist politician, High Sheriff of Down, 1924
 Humphrey Lyttelton, jazz musician and BBC radio presenter
 Ferdinand Mount, writer and novelist
 Ian Ogilvy, actor
 Stephen Powys, 6th Baron Lilford
 Hugh van Cutsem, landowner, banker, businessman, and horse-breeder

References

External links 
 Sunningdale School website

Boys' schools in Berkshire
Boarding schools in Berkshire
Educational institutions established in 1874
Preparatory schools in Berkshire
1874 establishments in England
Private schools in the Royal Borough of Windsor and Maidenhead